A hieroglyph (Greek for "sacred carvings") was a character of the ancient Egyptian writing system. Logographic scripts that are pictographic in form in a way reminiscent of ancient Egyptian are also sometimes called "hieroglyphs". In Neoplatonism, especially during the Renaissance, a "hieroglyph" was an artistic representation of an esoteric idea, which Neoplatonists believed actual Egyptian hieroglyphs to be. The word hieroglyphics refers to a hieroglyphic script. 

The Egyptians invented the pictorial script, which refers to any writing system that employs images as symbols for various semantic entities, rather than the abstract signs used by alphabets. The appearance of these distinctive figures in 3000 BCE marked the beginning of Egyptian civilization. Though based on images, Egyptian script was more than a sophisticated form of picture-writing. Each picture/glyph served one of three functions: (1) to represent the image of a thing or action, (2) to stand for a sound  or the sounds of one to as many as three syllables, or (3) to clarify the precise meaning of adjoining glyphs. Writing hieroglyphs required some artistic skill, limiting the number of scholars chosen to learn it. Only those privileged with an extensive education (i.e. the pharaoh, nobility and priests) were able to read and write hieroglyphs; others used simpler versions more suited for everyday handwriting: first the hieratic script, and later the demotic.

List of scripts and script-like systems sometimes labeled 'hieroglyphic'
 Anatolian hieroglyphs
 Aztec hieroglyphs
 Chinese characters
 Cretan hieroglyphs
 Egyptian hieroglyphs
 Mayan hieroglyphs
 Mi'kmaq hieroglyphs
 Muisca hieroglyphs
 Ojibwe hieroglyphs
 Olmec hieroglyphs
 Rongorongo

One of the two forms of the Meroitic writing system is usually described as "Meroitic hieroglyphs" because the characters are similar to and in most cases derived from Egyptian hieroglyphs. They are used, however, not as logographs but as an alphasyllabary.

In Eastern Slavic languages, the term hieroglyph refers to any morphemic script, and is commonly synonymous to Chinese and Japanese writing.

See also
 List of languages by writing system
 Monas Hieroglyphica
 Mother Goose in Hieroglyphics
 Unown

References

Further reading

External links

Etymologies
 
Egyptian inventions